Falcatula is a genus of moths in the family Sphingidae erected by Robert Herbert Carcasson in 1968.

Species
Falcatula cymatodes Rothschild & Jordan, 1912
Falcatula falcatus (Rothschild & Jordan, 1903)
Falcatula penumbra (Clark 1936)
Falcatula svaricki Haxaire & Melichar, 2008
Falcatula tamsi Carcasson, 1968

References

Smerinthini
Moth genera
Taxa named by Robert Herbert Carcasson